Sylvan Hills Middle School may refer to:
 Sylvan Hills Middle School (Sherwood, Arkansas, USA)
 Sylvan Hills Middle School (Atlanta, Georgia, USA)